David Trumbull (November 1, 1819 – February 1, 1889) was an early Protestant missionary in Chile and the founder of the Presbyterian Church in that country.

Trumbull, the son of John M. and Hannah W. (Tunis) Trumbull, was born in Elizabeth, New Jersey, November 1, 1819, his father being a grandson of Governor Jonathan Trumbull, the elder, of Connecticut.  He entered early on a business career in New York City, but when the house with which he was connected was blotted out in the commercial panic of 1837, he returned to his father, who had now removed to Colchester, Connecticut, and was prepared at the academy there for the Sophomore class in Yale College.

After graduation in 1842 he spent three years in Princeton Theological Seminary, and was ordained at Norwich, Conn., as a foreign missionary on June 13, 1845.  He had already accepted an appointment to go to Valparaiso, Chile, under the auspices of the Foreign Evangelical Society and the American Seamen's Friend Society, to accomplish what he could in the way of providing opportunities of Protestant worship for sailors and foreign residents speaking the English language. He landed in Valparaiso on Christmas Day, 1845, and began at once what proved to be his life-long work. In 1847 a Union Church was organized, and in 1848 he began the publication of an English paper. In 1849 he visited the United States, and was married in New Haven, June 5, 1850, to Jane W. Fitch, a niece of the Rev. Professor Fitch, of Yale College.  The next month he sailed again for Valparaiso, which was his home for the rest of his life.  He took a leading part in all philanthropic and charitable movements in Valparaiso, and won for himself by his career such a place in the public esteem that the Chilean press on the occasion of his death rendered the frankest and warmest tributes to his character and influence.

The degree of Doctor of Divinity was conferred on him by his Alma Mater in 1884.  In 1879 he was attacked with angina pectoris, and sought rest by a long visit to the United States. In 1886 there was a return of the disease, which was thenceforward kept in control by constant watchfulness. Special exertion at the end of December, 1888, brought on another series of attacks, and his death followed on February 1, in his 70th year. His wife survived him with two sons (graduates of Yale in 1878 and 1883) and two daughters; two other children died in infancy, and three in opening manhood and womanhood,—the deaths of the eldest son (Yale 1876) and of the third son (Yale 1880) being especially sudden and distressing.

References

External links
 The David and Jane Wales Trumbull Manuscript Collection at Princeton Theological Seminary. 

1819 births
1889 deaths
American evangelicals
American Presbyterian ministers
American Presbyterian missionaries
Yale College alumni
Princeton Theological Seminary alumni
Presbyterian missionaries in Chile
People from Elizabeth, New Jersey
American expatriates in Chile
Naturalized citizens of Chile
19th-century American clergy